Traumfrauen is a 2015 German comedy film directed by Anika Decker. It sold 1.7 million tickets making it one of the most successful German films of 2015.

Cast 
 Hannah Herzsprung - Leni Reimann
 Karoline Herfurth - Hannah Reimann
 Palina Rojinski - Vivienne
 Iris Berben - Margaux Reimann
 Elyas M'Barek - Joseph
 Frederick Lau - Peter Müller
  - Guy Cohen
 Friedrich von Thun - Carl Reimann
  - Gundula
 Max von Thun - Constantin
  - Philipp
 Nina Proll - Birte Schottenhammel
  - Dr. Hengesbach
 Nic Romm - Dr. Hennig

References

External links 

2015 comedy films
German comedy films
2010s German films
2010s German-language films